Dr Mary Hepburn OBE FRCOG (born 1949) is a Scottish obstetrician and gynaecologist who is known for her work to support socially disadvantaged women. She has been involved with the Glasgow Women's Reproductive Health Services, leading this service for 25 years and producing guidelines that have had an international impact.

Early life and education
Mary Hepburn was born in 1949 in Hackney, London. Her father was a general practitioner and her mother, a linguist. She was raised in Walls in the west of Shetland. She studied medicine at the University of Edinburgh, graduating in 1973. She completed her training as a general practitioner in Aberdeen, and then specialised in obstetrics.

Career
In 1990, she established the Glasgow Women's Reproductive Health Services to provide specialist support for pregnant women with drug and alcohol addictions, HIV, mental illness or experiencing homelessness, domestic abuse or rape. This multi-disciplinary service grew more than tenfold in three years, going from 12 patients in its first year to more than 130 in the third year. The clinic is part of NHS Greater Glasgow and Clyde and is now known as the Special Needs in Pregnancy Service (SNIPS). , around 300 women a year attend the clinic. Hepburn led the service for more than 25 years, and the guidelines used by the clinic are an internationally recognised method for treating socially-disadvantaged pregnant women, and have been adopted worldwide.

Hepburn was a senior lecturer in women's reproductive health at the Glasgow Royal Infirmary. She has also worked with the United Nations Children’s Fund, the World Health Organisation and Amnesty International, putting in place similar services and support for women around the world.

Awards and honours
 2007, lifetime achievement award from the domestic violence organisation Zero Tolerance.
 2012, named Scotswoman of the Year by the Evening Times newspaper.
 2015, OBE in the 2015 Birthday Honours

References 

1949 births
Living people
Scottish obstetricians
Scottish gynaecologists
People from Shetland
Officers of the Order of the British Empire
20th-century Scottish women
21st-century Scottish women
20th-century Scottish medical doctors
21st-century Scottish medical doctors
Scottish women medical doctors
Fellows of the Royal College of Obstetricians and Gynaecologists
Alumni of the University of Edinburgh
Women gynaecologists
20th-century women physicians
21st-century women physicians